Parthenina multicostata is a species of sea snail, a marine gastropod mollusk in the family Pyramidellidae, the pyrams and their allies.

References

 Jeffreys J.G. 1884. On the Mollusca procured during the 'Lightning' and 'Porcupine' expeditions, 1868-70. (Part VIII). Proceedings of the Zoological Society of London, 1882: 341-372, pl. 26-28
 Peñas, A.; Rolán, E.; Swinnen, F. (2014). The superfamily Pyramidelloidea Gray, 1840 (Mollusca, Gastropoda, Heterobranchia) in West Africa, 11. Addenda 3. Iberus. 32(2): 105-206 page(s): 114

External links
 To CLEMAM
 To Encyclopedia of Life
 To World Register of Marine Species

Pyramidellidae
Gastropods described in 1884